The Caledonia Bridge, also known as the Grand River Bridge (built 1927) is a road bridge located in Caledonia, Ontario, Canada on Argyle Street.

The bridge is the only nine-span bridge of its kind in Canada and is considered the first reinforced concrete bridge of its type ever built.

The bridge is on the Ontario Heritage Bridge List. and is designated by the Haldimand County LACAC (Local Architectural Conservation Advisory Committee).

The bridge is scheduled to be replaced by a new bridge due to structural damage and age. A number of bridge deficiencies were found requiring action. The condition included structural deficiencies, structural deterioration, insufficient roadside safety, foundation problems and inadequate hydraulics. The engineering consulting firm Morrison Hershfield was approached to conduct a Context Sensitive Design Workshop for the bridge. They involved stakeholders and representatives from the public to participate in the bridge design to address various environmental aspects of the project. Completion of the bridge was tentatively scheduled for 2012, but as of 2022, no work has been done towards its replacement.

History
The Hamilton-Port Dover Plank Road came through Caledonia in 1836, which resulted in the building of two Caledonia landmarks; Haldimand House: A Stagecoach-Inn, and the first Caledonia Bridge. This first bridge was wooden, with no pedestrian sidewalk, with wooden walls on either side for protection. Caledonia's Grand River Sachem reported the collapse of this bridge in 1861, stating that the "Spring Freshet" took out the bridge and damaged the Caledonia Dam.
Two temporary bridges were constructed between 1861 and 1874. The last temporary bridge was replaced by a new, state of the art, iron bridge in 1875. The iron being formed at Scott's Foundry located on the eastern corner of Edinburgh Square and Caithness Streets. A toll house was also constructed on the north side of the bridge, to pay off the more than $33,000.00 debt the town had incurred building the bridge. This bridge lasted until 1925 when a truck carrying a load of stone collapsed an entire span. This span was soon replaced and traffic carried on as usual, but a major overhaul was necessary in the long run.
In 1926 Construction started on a new bridge. The bridge was to be nine-spans, the first of its type in Canada. built with iron-reinforced concrete the new bridge carried two lanes of traffic and had a pedestrian sidewalk on either side. 
Major reconstruction work was conducted in 1983, and again in 2008.

Statistics
 Length: 
 Width: 
 Number of arches: 9

References

Bridges completed in 1927
Buildings and structures in Haldimand County
Road bridges in Ontario
Tied arch bridges in Canada
Former toll bridges in Canada
Grand River (Ontario)